Lysurus mokusin, commonly known as the lantern stinkhorn, the small lizard's claw, or the ribbed lizard claw, is a saprobic species of fungus in the family Phallaceae. The fruit body consists of a reddish, cylindrical fluted stipe that is capped with several "arms". The arms can approach or even close in on each other to form a spire. The gleba—an olive-green slimy spore mass—is carried on the outer surface of the arms. The fruit body, which has an odor comparable to "fresh dog feces", "rotting flesh", or "sewage" when mature, is edible in its immature "egg" stage. The fungus is native to Asia, and is also found in Australia, Europe and North America, where it is probably an introduced species. It has been used medicinally in China as an ulcer remedy.

History, taxonomy, and phylogeny
The species was first described by the Catholic Priest and missionary Pierre-Martial Cibot in the publication Novi Commentarii Academiae Scientiarum Imperialis Petropolitanae (New memoirs of the Imperial Academy of Sciences in St. Petersburg) (1775), where he reported finding it near Peking (now Beijing). This finding represents the earliest published scientific record of a fungus from China. Cibot's original name for the lantern stinkhorn, Phallus mokusin, was sanctioned by Christian Hendrik Persoon in his 1801 Synopsis Methodica Fungorum. In 1823, Elias Magnus Fries  transferred it to the genus Lysurus in his Systema Mycologicum. L. mokusin is the type species of the genus Lysurus.

In 1938, Y. Kobayasi reported the form L. mokusin f. sinensis, which he said differed from the main species in having a head that was more angular and conical at the top; the form sinensis was also reported in Korea in 1995. Some authors have attempted to define forms of L. mokusin as new species based on the degree of separation of the apical arms. For example, to contrast with his concept of Lysurus in which the arms were either free or slightly fused, the genus Lloydia was created by Chow in 1935 to contain species in which the tips of the arms were fused. As a result of various differing interpretations of the limits of L. mokusin, and the desire of some authors to define new species based on perceived differences, the fungus has acquired a lengthy list of synonyms over the years.

L. mokusin is commonly known as the "lantern stinkhorn", the "small lizard's claw", or the "ribbed lizard claw".

Lysuris mokusin has been included in a large-scale phylogenetic analysis of Gomphoid and Phalloid fungi published in 2006, and was shown to form a clade with Simblum sphaerocephalum, Lysurus borealis, and Protubera clathroidea.

Description

As the fungus matures, the egg ruptures as the fruit body rapidly expands, leaving volval remnants behind at the base. The basis of distinction between L. mokusin and other species of Lysurus is the angular form of its stipe. The sides branch out into 4–6 arms that are fused together at the tip to form a pointed apex, resembling a spire. As the mushroom matures, the arms may spread apart. The outer surface of the arms is coated by a brownish, slimy, foul-smelling spore mass called the gleba; its fetid odor helps it attract flies and other insects to assist in spore dispersal. The odor has been compared to "fresh dog feces", "rotting flesh" or sewage.

The spores are cylindrical in shape, smooth, thin-walled, and hyaline (translucent), with dimensions of 4–6 by 2–2.5 µm. Scanning electron microscopy reveals that one end of the spores has a hilar scar—an indentation in the spore wall that results during its separation from the sterigma of the basidium. The basidia (spore-bearing cells) are usually eight-spored, and the gleba composed of chains of roughly spherical, fusiform, ellipsoid to broadly club-shaped cells that are either 6.5–7.4 by 2.8–5.6 µm or 37.1–46.3 by 18–28 µm and also mixed with filamentous cells 2.3–4.5 µm wide. The hyphae of L. mokusin have clamp connections.

Similar species
Lysurus cruciatus is similar is appearance to L. mokusin, but has a cylindrical stem without any flutings at the tip. Lysurus borealis is also similar, but its stipe is not fluted, and without the angles present in L. mokusin.

Edibility and other uses
This species is considered to be edible when still in the immature "egg" stage, and is thought to be a delicacy in China. When mature, its foul odor would deter most individuals from attempting consumption. The fungus has been used medicinally in China as a remedy for ulcers.

Habitat and distribution
Lysurus mokusin is saprobic, and grows solitarily or in small groups in forest litter, and wood chip mulch used in landscaping, and compost. Documented sightings of L. mokusin include Australasia, the Canary Islands, Korea, Japan, China (Fujian Province), and the Bonin Islands. The species was unknown in Europe until it was reported in Italy in 1979; it is considered an alien species in that continent. In the United States, it has been collected from the states of California, Texas, Northeast Oklahoma and Washington, D.C. It was photographed in Frederick, Maryland on Sept 12, 2022.

References

Phallales
Medicinal fungi
Fungi of Asia
Fungi of Australia
Fungi of Europe
Fungi of the United States
Fungi described in 1775
Fungi without expected TNC conservation status